Hwang Jin-su (born 16 September 1957) is a South Korean judoka. He competed in the men's half-middleweight event at the 1984 Summer Olympics.

References

1957 births
Living people
South Korean male judoka
Olympic judoka of South Korea
Judoka at the 1984 Summer Olympics
Place of birth missing (living people)